The Greek Gospel of the Egyptians is an early Christian religious text. Its title is adopted from its opening line.

Dating 

The Greek Gospel of the Egyptians (which is quite distinct from the later, wholly Gnostic Coptic Gospel of the Egyptians), perhaps written in the second quarter of the 2nd century, was already cited in Clement of Alexandria's miscellany, the Stromata, where quotations give us many of the brief excerpts that are all that remain; it was also mentioned by Hippolytus, who alludes to "these various changes of the soul, set forth in the Gospel entitled according to the Egyptians" and connects the Gospel of the Egyptians with the Gnostic Naassene sect. Later, that 4th-century collector of heresies, Epiphanius of Salamis, asserts that the Sabellians made use of this gospel; though it is unlikely that he had any firsthand information about Sabellius, who taught in the early 3rd century. The euphemism, the Word logos, as an appellation of the Saviour, which appears in the gospel, betokens the influence of the Gospel of John, thus suggesting a date ca. 120 – 150. No text for it exists outside of these testimonies.

Content 

From these few fragments, it is unknown how much more extensive the contents were, or what other matters they discussed, or whether the known fragments present essentially the nature of the whole entity, which is apparently a "sayings" tradition worked into the familiar formula of a duologue. Also, due to the fragmentary nature, it is unknown whether it constitutes a version of some other known text. 

The Gospel of the Egyptians was apparently read in Egyptian churches in the 2nd and 3rd centuries.

The known fragments of text takes the form of a discussion between the disciple  Salome and Jesus, who advocates celibacy, or, more accurately, "each fragment endorses sexual asceticism as the means of breaking the lethal cycle of birth and of overcoming the alleged sinful differences between male and female, enabling all persons to return to what was understood to be their primordial and androgynous state" (Cameron 1982). The familiar question of Salome— "How long shall death prevail?" provoking Jesus' famous answer "As long as women bear children"— has echoes in other 2nd and 3rd century apocrypha and is instanced by Theodotus of Byzantium as if it were commonly known: "67. And when the Saviour says to Salome that there shall be death as long as women bear children, he did not say it as abusing birth, for that is necessary for the salvation of believers." This saying must have had a wide circulation, though it did not suit the purpose of any canonical Gospel. A similar view of the body as an entrapment of the soul was an essential understanding of Gnosticism. The rejection of marriage was also supported by the Encratites and many of the other early Christian groupings praised celibacy, and therefore it is difficult to tell from what group the text originated.

Comparison 

Another  comparable verse appended to the Gospel of Thomas, probably in Egypt, reads:
"114. Simon Peter said to them, "Make Mary leave us, for females are not worthy of life." Jesus said, "Look I shall guide her to make her male so that she too may become a living spirit resembling you males. For every female who makes herself male will enter the Kingdom of Heaven" (translation by Elaine Pagels and Marvin Myer in Elaine Pagels, Beyond Belief 2003, pp241f).

The Second Epistle of Clement (12:2) closely paraphrases a passage that was also quoted by Clement of Alexandria (in Stromateis iii):
iii. 13. 92. "When Salome inquired when the things concerning which she asked should be known, the Lord said: When ye have trampled on the garment of shame, and when the two become one and the male with the female is neither male nor female." Clement adds, "In the first place, then, we have not this saying in the four Gospels that have been delivered to us, but in that according to the Egyptians."

The trope appears in the Gospel of Thomas, saying (37): 
"When you strip naked without being ashamed, and take your garments and put them under your feet like little children and tread upon them, then [you] will see the child of the living" (Thomas, Layton translation).
 
For a somewhat later Gnostic work assigning a prominent role to Jesus' female disciples, see Pistis Sophia.

See also
 List of Gospels

References 
 James, Montague Rhodes, 1924. The Apocryphal New Testament (Oxford: Clarendon Press), pp 10 – 12.
 Cameron, Ron, 1982. The Other Gospels : Non-Canonical Gospel Texts (Philadelphia, PA: The Westminster Press).

External links 
 Early Christian Writings: Gospel of the Egyptians

Egyptians, Greek